VETO is a Danish indie rock band formed in 2004. They released their first EP, I Will Not Listen, in 2005 and their first full-length album, There's A Beat In All Machines, in 2006, both released on the Danish hip hop label, Tabu Records/Playground Music Denmark.

In February 2007 VETO won the award for Best New Act, as well as Best Danish Music Video at Danish Music Awards.

Their song "You Are A Knife" was featured briefly in the American television program NCIS episode "Suspicion".

VETO's second album is called Crushing Digits and was released 5 May 2008. The first single for the album, "Built to Fail", was released in March 2008 and received heavy airplay as "Ugens Uundgåelige" (Unavoidable of the week) on the public service radio channel DR P3.

The band was awarded Danish Band of the Year at the Danish Music Awards 2009.

The band's third studio album, entitled Everything is Amplified, was released February 25, 2011.

Discography

Albums

EP / Others
2005: I Will Not Listen EP [Tabu Records /Playground Music] (Released August 28, 2005)
2012: Sinus / Point Break (double CD special edition with CD 1 Sinus (6 tracks) / CD 2: Point Break (6 tracks) [Columbia / Sony Music]

Singles

Members 
 Troels Abrahamsen – Vocals, synth
 David Krogh Andersen – Guitar
 Mark Lee – Guitar, synth
 Jens Skov Thomsen – Bass guitar, backing vocals
 Mads Hasager – Drums

Notes

External links
 vetonet.dk - The official VETO blog
  - Interview with VETO on music is okay

Danish rock music groups
Danish indie rock groups
Danish alternative rock groups
Danish electronic rock musical groups
Musical groups established in 2004